Robley Cook Williams (October 13, 1908 – January 3, 1995) was an early biophysicist and virologist. He served as the first president of the Biophysical Society.

Career
Williams attended Cornell University on an athletic scholarship, completing a B.S. in 1931 and a Ph.D. in physics in 1935. While at Cornell, he was selected for membership in the Telluride House and the Quill and Dagger society. Williams began his career as a researcher as an assistant professor of astronomy at the University of Michigan, and from 1945, associate professor of physics. A growing fascination with viruses led him to leave Michigan in 1950, when he was invited to the University of California, Berkeley by Wendell Stanley, to serve as a professor at the newly created Department of Virology.

Research
Together with Heinz Fraenkel-Conrat, Williams studied the Tobacco mosaic virus, and showed that a functional virus could be created out of purified RNA and a protein coat. That same year, he was elected to the National Academy of Sciences. Williams was involved in the early use of electron micrography in biology. Working with Ralph Walter Graystone Wyckoff he helped develop a technique to take three-dimensional electron microscope images of bacteria using a "metal shadowing" technique.  He also helped develop biophysical techniques such as freeze etching and particle-counting by the spray-drop technique.

Personal
His son, Robley C. Williams, Jr., is a professor emeritus of biological science at Vanderbilt University.

Honors and awards
 1939: Edward Longstreth Medal from the Franklin Institute.

References

1908 births
1995 deaths
American biophysicists
American virologists
Cornell University alumni
Members of the United States National Academy of Sciences
University of Michigan faculty
Presidents of the Biophysical Society